The Biarritz Ladies Classic was a women's professional golf tournament on the Ladies European Tour that took place in Biarritz, France.

Winners

References

External links
Ladies European Tour

Former Ladies European Tour events
Defunct golf tournaments in France